Shirin Darreh Rural District is a rural district (dehestan) in the Central District of Quchan County, Razavi Khorasan province, Iran. At the 2006 census, its population was 15,898, in 3,832 families.  The rural district has 32 villages.

References 

Rural Districts of Razavi Khorasan Province
Quchan County